"Ain't She Somethin' Else" is a song recorded by American country music artist Eddy Raven.  It was released in November 1974 as the first single from the album This Is Eddy Raven.  The song reached number 46 on the Billboard Hot Country Singles & Tracks chart.  The song was written by Bill Rice and Jerry Foster.

Eddy Raven version

Chart performance

Conway Twitty version

The song was re-recorded in 1984 by American country music artist Conway Twitty.  Twitty's version was released in November of that year as the first single from his Latest Greatest Hits compilation album.  The song was Twitty's 33rd number one single on the country chart.  The single went to number one for one week and spent a total of 14 weeks on the country chart.

Chart performance

References

1974 songs
1984 singles
Eddy Raven songs
Conway Twitty songs
Songs written by Bill Rice
ABC Records singles
Warner Records singles
Songs written by Jerry Foster